Rice tenrecs are the two species in the Malagasy genus Oryzorictes. They are mammals in the family Tenrecidae. 
It contains the following species:
 Mole-like rice tenrec (Oryzorictes hova)
 Four-toed rice tenrec (Oryzorictes tetradactylus)

References

Afrosoricida
Taxa named by Alfred Grandidier
Taxonomy articles created by Polbot